The oriental plover (Charadrius veredus), also known as the oriental dotterel, is a medium-sized plover closely related to the Caspian plover. It breeds in parts of Mongolia and China, migrating southwards each year to spend its non-breeding season in Indonesia, New Guinea and northern Australia.

Description 
Adult male in breeding plumage: white face, throat and fore-crown; grey-brown hind-crown, hind-neck and back; belly white, demarcated with narrow black band and then broad chestnut breast band merging into white throat.  Female, juvenile and non-breeding male: generally grey-brown upperparts and white belly; pale face with white streak above eye.  Measurements: length 21–25 cm; wingspan 46–53 cm; weight 95 g.
Among the red-breasted Charadrius plovers, this bird is relatively large, long-legged and long-winged.

Distribution and habitat

Breeds in Mongolia, eastern Russia and Manchuria; migrates through eastern China and South-East Asia to Indonesia and northern Australia.  Rare in New Guinea; straggler to New Zealand and Europe four times (Finland, Norway, Sweden and the Netherlands). The oriental plover breeds in dry steppes, deserts, arid grasslands and saltpans. Its non-breeding habitat includes grasslands, salt-fields and coastal areas.

Food 
The oriental plover feeds mainly on insects.

Breeding 
The breeding of this bird has not been much studied but it nests on the ground.

Conservation 
About 90% of the oriental plovers that make the long journey south overwinter in Australia and it has been estimated that there may be 160,000 individuals of this species. With a large range and no evidence of significant population decline, this species’ conservation status is rated by the IUCN as being of Least Concern.

References 

 Marchant, S.; Higgins, P.J.; & Davies, J.N. (eds). (1994). Handbook of Australian, New Zealand and Antarctic Birds.  Volume 2: Raptors to Lapwings. Oxford University Press: Melbourne.  
 National Photographic Index of Australian Wildlife. (1987). The Shorebirds of Australia. Angus & Robertson: Sydney. 

oriental plover
Birds of Mongolia
oriental plover
Taxa named by John Gould